Jacqueline Peschard Mariscal is a Mexican sociologist who specializes in electoral integrity and democracy studies. She was President Commissioner of the Federal Institute for Access to Public Information from 2009 until 2013. She also served as Counselor to the Instituto Nacional Electoral from 1997 to 2003. In 2010, she was elected president of the Iberoamerican Network of Data Protection (RIPD), which is a forum for promoting the universal right to data protection across Latin America. 

She currently teaches at the Universidad Nacional Autónoma de México in Mexico City.

Education
Peschard has bachelor's and master's degrees from UNAM and a doctorate from El Colegio de Michoacán.

Research
She has taught at El Colegio de México, the Instituto Tecnológico Autónomo de México and the Universidad Nacional Autónoma de México. 

She has been a member of the Sistema Nacional de Investigadores Level II since October 2004. 

In 2004, she was an advisor to the United Nations Electoral Assistance Division on election stability in Iraq.

Published works

Transparencia: Promesas y Desafíos (Grandes Problemas) (El Colegio de México Press, 2017), 
Mexico's Democratic Challenges: Politics, Government, and Society (Stanford University Press, 2010), 
El Federalismo Electoral en Mexico (Miguel Angel Porrua, 2008), 
2 de Julio Reflexiones y Alternativas (UNAM Press, 2007), 
Hacia la Sociología (Addison Wesley Longman, March 2000),

External links
Right to Know by Jacqueline Peschard

References

Living people
Mexican sociologists
Mexican women sociologists
National Autonomous University of Mexico alumni
Academic staff of the National Autonomous University of Mexico
Academic staff of El Colegio de México
Academic staff of the Instituto Tecnológico Autónomo de México
Year of birth missing (living people)
Mexican women academics